Major-General Francis Gilbert Hamley (1815 – 12 January 1876), was a British Army officer who administered the South Australian government from 1868 to 1869.

Hamley was eldest son of Joseph Hamley and entered the army as ensign in the 12th Regiment of Foot in 1835. Hamley served in the  Kaffir War and in New Zealand. He was senior officer in command of the Imperial troops in the colony of South Australia on the death of Governor Sir Dominick Daly, on 19 February 1868. The next day he was sworn in as Administrator of the Government of the Colony, and remained Chief of the Executive till the arrival of Sir James Fergusson on 15 February  1869. He was then only lieut.-colonel. General Hamley died in London on 12 January 1876.

The following places in South Australia were named for him - County of Hamley and Hamley Bridge.

References

1815 births
1876 deaths
Administrators of South Australia